Christabel Mary Bielenberg (née Burton, 18 June 1909 – 2 November 2003) was a British writer who was married to a German lawyer, Peter Bielenberg. She described her experiences living in Germany during the Second World War in two books: The Past is Myself (1968) and The Road Ahead.

Life

Christabel Mary Burton was born in Totteridge, Hertfordshire to Anglo-Irish parents. Her mother, Christabel Harmsworth, was the sister of the British newspapers publishers Alfred Harmsworth, 1st Viscount Northcliffe, Cecil Bisshopp Harmsworth, 1st Baron Harmsworth, and Harold Sidney Harmsworth, 1st Viscount Rothermere. Her father was Lt-Col Percy Burton. She was educated at St Margaret's School, Bushey, Hertfordshire, and won a scholarship to Somerville College, Oxford, but decided instead to study music in Germany. While there she met Peter Bielenberg (1911–2001), two years her junior, who was studying law with a view to joining his father's practice in Hamburg.

They married in 1934 and she took German citizenship, which required her to relinquish her British citizenship. The Bielenbergs lived initially in Hamburg, then moved to Berlin and had three sons, Nicholas, Christopher, and John. The heavy Allied bombing raids led Mrs Bielenberg and her children to leave the city, and they eventually settled in the village of Rohrbach, near Furtwangen im Schwarzwald, in the Black Forest.

Both Christabel and Peter Bielenberg were opposed to Nazism and following Hitler's rise to power in 1933, participated in anti-Nazi activities. Peter Bielenberg was a close friend of Adam von Trott zu Solz, who was involved in the 20 July Plot against Hitler of 1944, and as a result of his suspect political views and this close association with Trott, Bielenberg  was arrested, interrogated, and imprisoned in Ravensbrück concentration camp following the failure of the plot. In an effort to secure his release, Christabel Bielenberg asked to be interviewed by the Gestapo to convince them of her and her husband's political naivete and innocence.

She was interviewed by SS-Sturmbannführer Herbert Lange. She was successful. Her husband was released but sentenced to punishment. He  managed to slip away and remained in hiding near his family until the war ended.

After the war, she returned to Britain with her children, later visiting Germany as a foreign correspondent for The Observer. In 1948, the family settled in Tullow, County Carlow, Ireland, buying a dilapidated farm called "Munny House", which they transformed into a commercial success.

As well as writing her autobiography she became involved with Irish politics in the 1970s and lectured in Germany. She was made a Commander of the German Federal Order of Merit and was also awarded a Gold Medal of Merit by the European Parliament.

Legacy

Her experiences during the Second World War were made into the BBC television drama serial Christabel (1988), adapted from her memoir by Dennis Potter. Elizabeth Hurley starred in the title role. In 1974, Christabel Bielenberg described her experiences of attempting to shelter Jews hiding from persecution in the television series The World at War.

Portrait bust
Christabel Bielenberg sat for sculptor Alan Thornhill for a portrait in clay. The correspondence file relating to the Bielenberg bust is held in the archive of the Henry Moore Foundation's Henry Moore Institute in Leeds and the terracotta remains in the collection of the artist.

Family
She had three sons, Nicholas, John, and Christopher. Nicholas and Christopher married sisters, Charlotte and Angela, respectively, both daughters of Fritz-Dietlof von der Schulenburg.

References

External links
 BBC interview, 4 November 2003. (RAM, for Real Player) with Christabel Bielenberg and with Elke Atcherley, daughter of the Bielenbergs' neighbour Carl Langbehn, who was executed following the plot to kill Hitler.
 Christabel Bielenberg, Sue Lawley, Desert Island Discs (BBC Radio 4), 8 November 1992
 

1909 births
2003 deaths
People educated at St Margaret's School, Bushey
German resistance members
People of Anglo-Irish descent
German non-fiction writers
People from Totteridge
People from County Carlow
Commanders Crosses of the Order of Merit of the Federal Republic of Germany
German expatriates in England
Irish expatriates in England
Harmsworth family
20th-century non-fiction writers